The meridian 119° west of Greenwich is a line of longitude that extends from the North Pole across the Arctic Ocean, North America, the Pacific Ocean, the Southern Ocean and Antarctica to the South Pole.

The 119th meridian west forms a great circle with the 61st meridian east.

From Pole to Pole
Starting at the North Pole and heading south to the South Pole, the 119th meridian west passes through:

{| class="wikitable plainrowheaders"
! scope="col" width="130" | Co-ordinates
! scope="col" | Country, territory or sea
! scope="col" | Notes
|-
| style="background:#b0e0e6;" | 
! scope="row" style="background:#b0e0e6;" | Arctic Ocean
| style="background:#b0e0e6;" |
|-
| 
! scope="row" | 
| Northwest Territories — Prince Patrick Island
|-
| style="background:#b0e0e6;" | 
! scope="row" style="background:#b0e0e6;" | Crozier Channel
| style="background:#b0e0e6;" |
|-
| 
! scope="row" | 
| Northwest Territories — Eglinton Island
|-
| style="background:#b0e0e6;" | 
! scope="row" style="background:#b0e0e6;" | M'Clure Strait
| style="background:#b0e0e6;" |
|-
| 
! scope="row" | 
| Northwest Territories — Banks Island
|-
| style="background:#b0e0e6;" | 
! scope="row" style="background:#b0e0e6;" | Prince of Wales Strait
| style="background:#b0e0e6;" |
|-
| 
! scope="row" | 
| Northwest Territories — Victoria Island
|-
| style="background:#b0e0e6;" | 
! scope="row" style="background:#b0e0e6;" | Amundsen Gulf
| style="background:#b0e0e6;" |
|-valign="top"
| 
! scope="row" | 
|-valign="top"
| 
! scope="row" | 
|-valign="top"
| style="background:#b0e0e6;" | 
! scope="row" style="background:#b0e0e6;" | Pacific Ocean
| style="background:#b0e0e6;" | Passing just east of Santa Barbara Island, California,  (at )
|-
| style="background:#b0e0e6;" | 
! scope="row" style="background:#b0e0e6;" | Southern Ocean
| style="background:#b0e0e6;" |
|-
| 
! scope="row" | Antarctica
| Unclaimed territory
|-
|}

See also
118th meridian west
120th meridian west

w119 meridian west